Devrukh is a town in the tehsil of Sangameshwar in the Ratnagiri district of the Indian state of Maharashtra. It is headquarters for the Sangameshwar tehsil and a part of the Konkan region. The town enjoys salubrious climate, and the majority population is involved in agriculture. Summers are warm and winters are not very chilly. Every year Devrukh experiences heavy monsoon (400 cm to 500 cm annual rains). Rice, cashew and alphonso (hapus) mangoes are the major crops in Devrukh.

People & history
History tells us that Shivaji and Sambhaji visited Devrukh frequently. Shivaji visited Shri Soljai temple many times. Devrukh lies on the shortest way from Raigad fort to Vishalgad fort in the Konkan route. Chousupi in Devrukh is a famous place, which was used as a horse stable during the time of Sambhaji. Kavi Kalash was the caretaker of this place.

Devrukh was the birthplace of social reformer Parvatibai Athavale. As well as birthplace of Shankar Dhondsheth Sardal and his daughter Vimal Shankar Sardal, freedom fighter. Shankar Dhadsheth Sardal played an important role in Bhudan-Chalval with Vinoba Bhave. Shankar Sardal converted Leela Vishvabhar Kanadi literature in Marathi.

Water sources

Saptalingi River & Bav River are the rivers providing water to this village. Bavnadi is starting from Sahydri hills near to Chandoli sanctuary and Saptlingi also starting from Sahydri hills. Saptlingi means Seven shiva temples situated on the bank if this river like Vadeshwar, Nilkanteshware etc.

Educational facilities

Devrukh Shikshan Prasarak Mandal, Devrukh, Founded in 1927, is one of the oldest educational institutes from Konkan Region of Maharashtra. Devrukh Shikshan Prasarak Mandal (DSPM) was founded in 1927 by Hon'ble Late Shri Kakasaheb Pandit, Shri Dadasaheb Mavlankar (first Speaker of Lok Sabha), Late Shri Vinayakrao Ketkar (Attorney at Law), Late Shri Dadasaheb Pitre, Late Shri Raosaheb Kulkarni, Late Shri Dadasaheb Sardeshpande and other honourable like-minded citizens from Devrukh. In 1972, Late Shri Tatyasaheb Athalye along with Late Shri Vishwanathrao Sapre took up the massive task of bringing college education to the doorstep of the local masses, by setting up the twin Arts and Commerce faculties in the Devrukh campus. Late Shri Arun V Athalye, who had stood personal guarantee to massive Term Loans extended to the institution, was instrumental in making the institution debt-free and had donated his personal collection of paintings of Old Masters from The Bombay School of Art to the institution.
The institution runs the New English School, Devrukh, which was set up in 1927, and educates students from Standard V thru' Standard X and boasts of a long list of well placed alumni. The institution has a Jr College of Science named Guruvarya Kakasaheb Sapre Jr College of Science which was started to commemorate the memory of one of its illustrious Head Masters, Late Kakasaheb Sapre. The institution also has set up an English Medium School, Smt. Arudhatee Arun Padhye English Medium School, Devrukh, which has received recognition from the Government of Maharashtra. The school educates from Nursery and kindergarten thru' Standard VIII and is developing further, with a current student strength of about 400 students. Soljai devi Temple is most attractive newly built.  Matru Mandir society is a charitable institution that runs many hospitals, farms, hostels, orphanages since 40+ years.

The Rajendra Mane College of Engineering and Technology is located at distance of about 5 km from the town of Devrukh.

Tourism

Saptlingi River - In 2022 the Nagar panchayat of Devrukh village started boating services in this river for boosting tourism.  You will find the total of 7 Shiva temples bank of this river so it is called a Sapt(7) Ling (Shiv Ling).

Marleshwar: an ancient Cave Shiva Temple, which is at a distance of 17.4 km from Devrukh.

Karneshwar: built in the Hemadapanthi style of Shiva Temples, located at around 22 km from Devrukh.

Tikleshwar: located near Devrukh. This temple is on the top of Sahydri hill. From this place, three villages can be seen.

Kedarling temple: The Gramdevata of the village Katavli, which is located 10 km from Dervukh.

Other destinations

Soljai Temple: the Gramdevata of this village. Shivaji was visiting this place whenever traveling from Raigad Fort to Vishalgad fort.

Mahipat Fort: located in Sangameshwar taluka of Ratnagiri district. The fort is spread from south to north and is adventurous for trekking and has good vegetation cover on it. There are many remnants on the fort hidden in the woods. To the north and east of the fort are Kundi and Nigudwadi villages respectively. Every year the local villagers celebrate the festival of Dussehra on the fort.

Road
Devrukh is a small town situated in the Sangameshwar Taluka.  It is 17 km from Sangameshwar and 49 km from Ratnagiri.
MSRTC provides regular service by which one can reach this place. A lot of private vehicle operators operate vehicles between Sangmenshwar and Devrukh. Devrukh is 100 km from Kolhapur and MSRTC provides frequent service on Kolhapur–Devrukh route as well. It is 210 km from Belgaum.

Railway

There is no direct access for Konkan Railway. But there are few MSRTC buses which ply towards railway station and access for railway station is Sangameshwar & Ratnagiri.

References

Villages in Ratnagiri district